The 2001 TCU Horned Frogs football team represented Texas Christian University as a member of Conference USA (C-USA) during the 2001 NCAA Division I-A football season. Led by first-year head coach Gary Patterson, the Horned Frogs compiled an overall record of 6–6 with a mark of 4–3 in conference play, tying for fifth place in C-USA. TCU was invited to the Galleryfurniture.com Bowl, where they lost Texas A&M. The team play home games at Amon G. Carter Stadium on campus in Fort Worth, Texas.

A game with Marshall was originally scheduled for September 15, but was canceled in the aftermath of the September 11 attacks.

Schedule

Roster

References

TCU
TCU Horned Frogs football seasons
TCU Horned Frogs football